The Kansas–Nebraska football rivalry was an American college football rivalry between the Kansas Jayhawks and Nebraska Cornhuskers. The rivalry dissolved when Nebraska left the Big 12 Conference for the Big Ten Conference in 2010. The rivalry was more prominent early in the 20th century but began to fall off as Nebraska began to dominate the series, winning all but four games between 1962 and when Nebraska left the Big 12 after the 2010 season and by an average of 28.3 points.

History
The rivalry was a "border rivalry", and at the time of its ending was the longest non-interrupted rivalry in college football history at 105 straight games. The final game of the 105-game stretch was a 20–3 Nebraska victory on November 13, 2010. No future games are scheduled.

During the 2010–2014 NCAA conference realignment, Kansas and Nebraska were among six Big 12 schools that sought entry to the Big Ten Conference, though Nebraska was the only member to join.

Game results

See also 
 List of NCAA college football rivalry games
 List of most-played college football series in NCAA Division I

References

College football rivalries in the United States
Kansas Jayhawks football
Nebraska Cornhuskers football